Douglas Robert Gain (born 29 December 1976), is a South African cricketer. He is a right-handed batsman and an occasional right-arm medium pace bowler.

He captained the South Africa Under 19s during their tour of India, against the Indian Under 19s. In the three match series, in which he captained all three matches, he won one, lost one and drew the last one. A batsman with one first-class century and 11 half-centuries to his name, he has played for Boland, Gauteng and Transvaal.

References

South African cricketers
1976 births
Living people
Boland cricketers
Gauteng cricketers